Johannes Adrianus Maria (Hans) van Tongeren (18 January 1955, Breda – 25 August 1982, Amsterdam) was a Dutch movie actor, who made his debut in the 1980 Paul Verhoeven movie Spetters.

Van Tongeren was born in Breda and was recommended to Joop van den Ende for the role of "Rien" in Spetters by casting-director Hans Kemna. The character Rien is a talented motocrosser who is paralyzed in an accident and dies by suicide. Spetters was a very successful movie and van Tongeren was cast afterwards for several Dutch movies.

In 1982 Van Tongeren played a minor role with Peter Gallagher and Daryl Hannah in the American movie Summer Lovers. Van Tongeren had been admitted to mental hospitals several times; according to the Dutch media he identified too much with his roles. On 25 August 1982 he died by suicide, just after having been cast in a Nouchka van Brakel film after the novel Van de koele meren des doods by Frederik van Eeden, in which he would again have played a person planning to die by suicide.

Filmography

References

External links

1955 births
1982 deaths
Dutch male film actors
People from Breda
20th-century Dutch male actors
1982 suicides